TNT Jackson, released in the Philippines as Dynamite Wong and T.N.T. Jackson, is a 1974 American blaxploitation film produced and directed by Cirio H. Santiago. The script was originally written by actor Dick Miller, but Roger Corman had it rewritten.

Plot
The film is about Diana Jackson (aka TNT), who learns her brother is missing. She suspects a powerful gangster and his friends are behind the disappearance. Determined to get at the truth, she goes to Hong Kong, and along with a friend named Joe, wages war on the criminal gang she's out to nail.

Cast
 Jeanne Bell as Diana "TNT" Jackson
 Chiquito as "Dynamite" Wong
 Stan Shaw as Charlie
 Max Alvarado
 Pat Anderson as Elaine
 Ken Metcalfe as Sid
 Imelda Ilanan as Joe's Assistant
 Leo Martinez
 Percy Gordon
 Chris Cruz
 Joonee Gamboa as Drug Dealer
 Jose Mari Avellana as Ming (uncredited)
 Shirley Washington as (uncredited)

See also
List of American films of 1974
List of blaxploitation films

References

External links

TNT Jackson at Trailers from Hell

1974 films
1970s action drama films
American action drama films
American multilingual films
Blaxploitation films
1974 multilingual films
Filipino-language films
Films set in Hong Kong
Philippine multilingual films
Tagalog-language films
Philippine action drama films
1974 drama films
1970s English-language films
Films directed by Cirio H. Santiago
1970s American films